Howard Conkling (December 7, 1855 – September 5, 1938) was an American lawyer and politician from New York.

Life 
Conkling was born on December 7, 1855, at 27 E. 10th St., the family's Manhattan home. He was a member of the Seymour-Conkling family; his father was Representative Frederick A. Conkling, his uncle was Senator Roscoe Conkling, and his brother was New York assemblyman Alfred R. Conkling.

Conkling attended Mount Washington Collegiate Institute in Washington Square. From 1879 to 1881 he served as clerk for New York City Fire Department Chief Eli Bates. He also worked as a clerk in an importing house. After travelling for several years, he moved to Luzerne, New York, where he worked in the lumbering business. He founded the Luzerne Driving Park Association and served as vice-president of the Warren County Agricultural Society and secretary of the United States of the Society for Instruction in First Aid to the Injured. He also had a picture gallery with a collection of prints and engravings on the history of the United States.

In 1891, Conkling was first elected to the New York State Assembly as a Republican, representing Warren County. He served in the Assembly in 1892 and 1893. He then attended New York University School of Law, graduating in 1896 and later passing the bar. He was a member of the Delta Chi fraternity. At one point, he moved to Indiana and was admitted to the bar in Indianapolis, but later returned to New York City and practiced law there. He also worked in real estate.

In the 1898 United States House of Representatives election, Conkling ran for the House of Representatives in New York's 12th congressional district. He lost the election to George B. McClellan Jr. He then returned to the New York State Assembly in 1903, 1914, and 1915.

Conkling wrote several books, including one on his travels to Mexico called "Mexico and the Mexicans" and a biography on Le Chevalier de la Luzerne. He was interested in the French language and was an officer of Alliance française. He was a member of the Union Club, the Metropolitan Club, the New York Athletic Club, and the Saint Nicholas Society of the City of New York. He was a pewholder of the Church of the Transfiguration, Episcopal.

When Conkling retired from law in around 1918, he moved to Providence, Rhode Island. He died on September 5, 1938, in Butler Hospital. He was buried in Green-Wood Cemetery.

References

External links 

 The Political Graveyard
 Howard Conkling at Find a Grave

1855 births
1938 deaths
Politicians from Manhattan
People from Warren County, New York
19th-century American politicians
20th-century American politicians
Republican Party members of the New York State Assembly
New York University School of Law alumni
Lawyers from New York City
People from Providence, Rhode Island
20th-century American Episcopalians
Burials at Green-Wood Cemetery
Conkling family